Morongo may refer to:

People
 Morongo Band of Mission Indians
 Maarrênga’yam Serrano people, or people from Morongo

Places

California
 Morongo Basin, in San Bernardino County
 Morongo Indian Reservation, in the San Gorgonio Pass, Riverside County
 Morongo Casino, Resort & Spa
 Morongo Valley in San Bernardino County

Other places
 Morongo estate, an historic homestead in Bell Post Hill, Geelong, Australia
 Morongo Girls' College in Geelong, Australia that closed in 1994
 Morongo Uta, an archeological site on Rapa Iti, French Polynesia

Other uses
 Morongo Unified School District
 Morongo Valles, a valley on the planet Venus

See also
 Cabazon, California, an unincorporated community associated with the Morongo Indian Reservation
 Mofongo, a Puerto Rican dish with fried plantains
 Mohongo or Sacred Sun (1809 – 1836), a Native American woman of the Osage Nation
 Morengo,  a municipality in Bergamo, Lombardy, Italy
 Morong (disambiguation)